Protolampra is a genus of moths of the family Noctuidae.

Species
 Protolampra brunneicollis (Grote, 1864)
 Protolampra hero (Morrison, 1876)
 Protolampra rufipectus (Morrison, 1875)
 Protolampra sobrina (Duponchel, 1843)

References
Natural History Museum Lepidoptera genus database
Protolampra at funet

Noctuinae